Duets: 20th Anniversary Deluxe Edition is a 2013 box set album by American singer Frank Sinatra.

To commemorate the 20th anniversary of Frank Sinatra's groundbreaking and highly successful album, Duets, Capitol/UMe released a newly remastered Sinatra Duets - Twentieth Anniversary 2CD Deluxe Edition bringing together the original Duets, and the follow-up Duets II, together in one deluxe package. Included on the 2CD deluxe edition are two never-before-released recordings: 'One for My Baby (And One More for the Road)' featuring Tom Scott and 'Embraceable You' with Tanya Tucker plus the rare bonus tracks 'Fly Me to the Moon' with George Strait and two versions of 'My Way' one recorded with Luciano Pavarotti and the other with Willie Nelson. This 20th anniversary album features brand new cover art as well as a 32-page booklet with rare photos and both original and new liner notes.

Track listing

Disc one
 "The Lady Is a Tramp" (Richard Rodgers, Lorenz Hart) (with Luther Vandross) - 3:24
 "What Now My Love" (Gilbert Becaud, Carl Sigman, Pierre Leroyer) (with Aretha Franklin) - 3:15
 "I've Got a Crush on You" (George Gershwin, Ira Gershwin) (with Barbra Streisand) - 3:23
 "Summer Wind" (Heinz Meier, Hans Bradtke, Johnny Mercer) (with Julio Iglesias) - 2:32
 "Come Rain or Come Shine" (Harold Arlen, Mercer) (with Gloria Estefan) - 4:04
 "New York, New York" (Fred Ebb, John Kander) (with Tony Bennett) - 3:30
 "They Can't Take That Away from Me" (G. Gershwin, I. Gershwin) (with Natalie Cole) - 3:11
 "You Make Me Feel So Young" (Mack Gordon, Josef Myrow) (with Charles Aznavour) - 3:05
 "Guess I'll Hang My Tears Out to Dry"/"In the Wee Small Hours of the Morning" (Sammy Cahn, Jule Styne)/(Bob Hilliard, David Mann) (with Carly Simon) - 3:57
 "I've Got the World on a String" (Arlen, Ted Koehler) (with Liza Minnelli) - 2:18
 "Witchcraft" (Cy Coleman, Carolyn Leigh) (with Anita Baker) - 3:22
 "I've Got You Under My Skin" (Cole Porter) (with Bono) - 3:32
 "All the Way"/"One for My Baby (and One More for the Road)" (Cahn, Jimmy Van Heusen)/(Arlen, Mercer) (with Kenny G) - 6:03
 "My Way" [Previously unreleased] (Paul Anka, Claude Francois, Jacques Revaux, Gilles Thibault) (with Luciano Pavarotti) - 3:33
 "One For My Baby (And One More For The Road)" [Previously unreleased] (with Tom Scott)

Disc two
 "For Once in My Life" (Ron Miller, Orlando Murden) (with Gladys Knight and Stevie Wonder) - 3:18
 "Come Fly with Me" (Cahn, Van Heusen) (with Luis Miguel) - 4:17
 "Bewitched, Bothered and Bewildered" (Rodgers, Hart) (with Patti LaBelle) - 3:31
 "The Best is Yet to Come" (Coleman, Leigh) (with Jon Secada) - 3:12
 "Moonlight in Vermont" (John Blackburn, Karl Suessdorf) (with Linda Ronstadt) - 4:07
 "Fly Me to the Moon" (Bart Howard) (with Antonio Carlos Jobim) - 3:06
 "Luck Be a Lady" (Frank Loesser) (with Chrissie Hynde) - 5:17
 "A Foggy Day" (G. Gershwin, I. Gershwin) (with Willie Nelson) - 2:24
 "Where or When" (Rodgers, Hart) (with Steve Lawrence and Eydie Gorme) - 3:53
 "Embraceable You" (G. Gershwin, I. Gershwin) (with Lena Horne) - 3:45
 "Mack the Knife" (Marc Blitzstein, Bertolt Brecht, Kurt Weill) (with Jimmy Buffett) - 4:26
 "How Do You Keep the Music Playing?"/"My Funny Valentine" (Alan Bergman, Marilyn Bergman, Michel Legrand)/(Rodgers, Hart) (with Lorrie Morgan) - 3:58
 "My Kind of Town" (Cahn, Van Heusen) (with Frank Sinatra, Jr.) - 2:33
 "The House I Live In" (Lewis Allan, Earl Robinson) (with Neil Diamond) - 4:14
 "My Way" [bonus track] (with Willie Nelson) - 4:22
 "Embraceable You" [previously unreleased] (with Tanya Tucker)
 "Fly Me to the Moon" [previously unreleased] (with George Strait)

Disc three (DVD)
 Sinatra: Duets (Electronic Press Kit, 1993)
 I've Got You Under My Skin -duet with Bono (Music Video)
 Bonus Interviews

References

2013 compilation albums
Frank Sinatra compilation albums
Reissue albums